Dysmorphococcus is a genus of green algae in the order Chlamydomonadales. It is a freshwater type of algae.

References

External links

Chlamydomonadales genera
Chlamydomonadales